Moo or MOO may refer to:

In computing
MOO, a type of text-based online virtual reality system
MOO (programming language)
Moo.fx, a JavaScript effects library

In entertainment and media
Moo (novel), by Jane Smiley
"Mooo!", a song by rapper Doja Cat
moo, a computer program to play Bulls and Cows
MoO or Master of Orion, a computer game
Moo, a character in anime Monster Rancher
"Moo", a song by Cashmere Cat from his 2019 album Princess Catgirl

People
Barbara E. Moo, American computer scientist
Douglas J. Moo, scholar who specialized in the New Testament 
Eric Moo, singer and composer
Moo Ko-Suen, covert agent of China who tried to purchase US military equipment

Other uses
Moʻo, legendary creatures in Hawaiian mythology
Moo (restaurant), a Michelin-starred restaurant in Barcelona, Spain
Moo language, Adamawa language of Nigeria
"Moo", an onomatopoeic word for the sound made by cattle
Moo or Muban ("village"), the lowest administrative sub-division of Thailand
Moomba Airport, IATA airport code "MOO"

See also

MU (disambiguation)
Moo2 (disambiguation)
Moo moo (disambiguation)